The men's 200 metre backstroke event at the 1972 Summer Olympics took place on September 2 at the Olympia Schwimmhalle. There were 36 competitors from 23 nations, with each nation having up to 3 swimmers. The podium was very similar to the previous Games in 1968, with Roland Matthes of East Germany winning gold and the United States taking the other two medals, including one going to Mitch Ivey. Matthes and Ivey were the first two men to earn multiple medals in the event, with Matthes the first to win back-to-back championships and Ivey adding his 1972 bronze to his 1968 silver. Mike Stamm was the silver medalist in Munich. Matthes also defended his 1968 100 metre backstroke title, giving him the backstroke double a second time.

Background

This was the fourth appearance of the 200 metre backstroke event. It was first held in 1900. The event did not return until 1964; since then, it has been on the programme at every Summer Games. From 1904 to 1960, a men's 100 metre backstroke was held instead. In 1964, only the 200 metres was held. Beginning in 1968 and ever since, both the 100 and 200 metre versions have been held.

Two of the 8 finalists from the 1968 Games returned: gold medalist Roland Matthes of East Germany and silver medalist Mitch Ivey of the United States. The American team also included Mike Stamm, who had briefly held the world record in the event in 1970 before Matthes broke it in 1970 (and then bettered his own record in 1971 and at the East German Olympic trials in 1972).

Brazil, Cambodia (then Khmer Republic), El Salvador, and Yugoslavia each made their debut in the event. Italy and the Netherlands each made their fourth appearance, the only two nations to have competed at each appearance of the event to that point.

Competition format

The competition used a two-round (heats and final) format. The advancement rule followed the format introduced in 1952. A swimmer's place in the heat was not used to determine advancement; instead, the fastest times from across all heats in a round were used. There were 5 heats of up to 8 swimmers each. The top 8 swimmers advanced to the final. Swim-offs were used as necessary to break ties.

This swimming event used backstroke. Because an Olympic-size swimming pool is 50 metres long, this race consisted of four lengths of the pool.

Records

These were the standing world and Olympic records (in seconds) prior to the 1964 Summer Olympics.

Mike Stamm broke the Olympic record with a time of 2:07.51 in the second heat. Roland Matthes broke that record with 2:06.62 in the fifth heat. Matthes's final time of 2:02.82 is considered equal to his prior world record of 2:02.8. In all, six of the finalists beat the old Olympic record set in 1968; four were better than the record set in the heats.

Schedule

All times are Central European Time (UTC+1)

Results

Heats

Final

References

Men's backstroke 200 metre
200 metre backstroke at the Olympics
Men's events at the 1972 Summer Olympics